GCS may refer to:

Cartography
 Galactic coordinate system
 Geographic coordinate system

Computing
 Game creation system
 Gauss Centre for Supercomputing, in Germany
Google Cloud Storage
 Group communication system
 Group Control System, an IBM VM Operating system component

Education 
 Gadsden County School District, in Florida, United States
 Gallantry Cross, Silver, an honour of the Republic of Venda
 Gaston Christian School, in Lowell, North Carolina, United States
 German Church School, in Addis Ababa, Ethiopia
 Glenelg Country School, in Ellicott City, Maryland, United States
 Gorey Community School, in County Wexford, Ireland
 Government College of Science, Lahore, Pakistan
 Grace Christian School (Florida), in Valrico, Florida, United States
 Grace Church School, in New York City
 Grand Charter School, in Lahore, Pakistan
 Granville County Schools, in North Carolina, United States
 Greenfield Community School, in Dubai
 Greenville Christian School, in Mississippi, United States
 Greenwood College School, in Toronto, Ontario, Canada
 Guadalupe Catholic School, in Makati, Philippines
 Guildford County School, in England

Medicine 
 Gamma-glutamylcysteine synthetase
 Gender confirming surgery
 Glasgow Coma Scale
 Glucocorticosteroids
 Glycine cleavage system

Other uses
 General Campaign Star (Canada), a Canadian Forces medal
 Grand Central Station, in New York City
 Satellite ground control station
 UAV ground control station
 Global Civic Sharing, a South Korean charity
 Global Combat Ship, of the Royal Navy
 Garena Challenge Series, An Arena of Valor professional esports league based in Taiwan.
 Gold Coast Suns, an Australian Football League team

See also 
 GC (disambiguation)